Pertain is a former commune in the Somme department in Hauts-de-France in northern France. On 1 January 2017, it was merged into the new commune Hypercourt.

Geography

Population

History
Founded around the end of the first millennium, the village was first known as "Pertaing". Made up of several now-disappeared hamlets, such as  "Mory", "Sacy-Les-Pertain" and “Berseaucourt”.

Places of interest
 Modern church of Saint Rémy
 War memorial
 Pigeon houses from the 1950s
 Vestiges of Gallo-Roman villas
 The foundations of a medieval manor house.

See also
Communes of the Somme department

References

Former communes of Somme (department)
Populated places disestablished in 2017